The list of ship commissionings in 1859 includes a chronological list of all ships commissioned in 1859.


See also 

1859